The Arevaci or Aravaci (Arevakos, Arvatkos or Areukas in the Greek sources), were a Celtic people who settled in the central Meseta of northern Hispania and dominated most of Celtiberia from the 4th to late 2nd centuries BC. The Vaccaei were their allies.

Origins
The Arevaci were of Celtic origin and part of the group of peoples known as the Celtiberians. 
There is an overwhelming amount of evidence that the ancestors of the Celtiberian groups were installed in the Meseta area of the Iberian peninsula from at least 1000 BC and probably much earlier. 
Some think their ancestors were early ‘Q-Celtic’ speakers from Gaul who migrated to the peninsula around the mid-6th century BC, arriving at about the same time as the powerful Vaccaei people of the western Meseta.  This led some modern historians to state that the Arevaci were actually an offshoot of the latter, thus their tribal name which means ‘Are-Vaccei’ or ‘eastern’ Vacceians.  However, an alternative etymology is given by the Roman geographer Pliny the elder who calls them Celtiberi Arevaci, adding that they borrowed their name from the river Areva (Araviana) and thus their designation could be translated as ‘those who dwell at the Areva’ or ‘on the Areva’.

Location

The nucleus of the Arevaci homeland was the modern provinces of Soria and most of Guadalajara up to the Tagus sources, extending to the eastern half of Segovia and the southeastern Burgos, but for a while they dominated parts of neighbouring Zaragoza province. They founded or seized several important city-states (Civitates) in northern Celtiberia, namely:
 Clunia (either Alto del Cuerno or Coruña del Conde – Burgos; Celtiberian mint: Kolounioku),
 Voluce/Veluka (around Calatañazor – Soria), 
 Uxama Argelae (Cerro de Castro, near Osma – Soria; Celtiberian mints: Arcailicos/Uzamuz),
 Termantia (Montejo de Tiermes – Soria) also named Termes or Termesos,
 Savia (Soria?)
 Numantia (Muela de Garray – Soria). 
Other towns often mentioned in the sources, such as Segovia, Ocilis, Comfluenta, Tucris, Lutia, Mallia, Lagni and Colenda have not yet been located.

Culture

They shared with the Vaccaei the same social structure of collectivist type which enabled the latter to exploit successfully the wheat- and grass-growing areas of the western plateau, though archeological evidence suggests that the Arevaci were predominantly stock-raisers who practiced transhumance in the grazing lowlands of the upper Ebro valley. They reared sheep (mostly for their wool), horses, and oxen, as attested by the tribute of thirty talents imposed upon Numantia and Termantia by Consul Quintus Aulus Pompeius in 139 BC, for which the Numantines and Termantines paid (albeit reluctantly) in the form of 3,000 ox-hides, 800 horses, and 9,000 saga (woollen cloaks).

Religion
They practised the rite of excarnation by exposing the corpses of warriors slain in battle to the vultures, as described by Silius Italicus and Claudius Aelianus, and attested by funerary stelae and painted pottery from Numantia.

History
Regarded by the Greeks and Romans as the most militaristic people of the eastern Meseta, the Arevaci were said by Herodotus to have embarked early on an expansionist policy by taking part in the Celtici migrations of the 5th century BC alongside off-shots of Lusones and Vaccaei peoples to settle in the Iberian southwest.  In the late 4th-early 3rd centuries BC however, the Arevaci shifted the direction of their expansion to the east, towards the upper Duero and south into the central Iberian system mountains.  Here they displaced the earlier inhabitants the Pellendones, conquering the towns of Savia and Numantia and submitted the Uraci, thus gaining control over the strategic towns of Aregrada (Ágreda? – Soria; Celtiberian mints: Areicoraticos/Arecorataz), Cortona (Medinaceli? – Soria), Segontia (Sigüenza – Guadalajara) and Arcobriga (Monreal de Ariza – Zaragoza).

In around the mid-3rd century BC, the Arevaci founded with their neighbours the Lusones, Belli, and Titii, a tribal federation designated the Celtiberian confederacy, with Numantia as its capital.

During the Second Punic War the confederacy kept itself neutral, though Celtiberian mercenaries are mentioned fighting for both sides on a number of occasions. The first Roman incursion into the Celtiberian heartland occurred around 195 BC under Consul Cato the Elder, who attacked unsuccessfully the towns of Seguntia Celtiberorum and Numantia, where he allegedly delivered a speech to the numantines.

The Arevaci and the Belli revolted against Roman rule in the Celtiberian War.

With the fall of Numantia in 134-133 BC, the Romans forcibly disbanded the Celtiberian confederacy and allowed the Pellendones and Uraci to regain their independence from the Arevaci, who were now technically submitted and absorbed into Hispania Citerior province.
Nevertheless, the remaining Arevacian cities managed to keep much of their military capabilities intact, and led by Clunia and Termantia they helped defending Celtiberia from invasion attempts by both the Lusitani in 114 BC and the Cimbri, who poured from the Pyrenees around 104-103 BC. Emboldened by these successes – and resented by the lack of Roman recognition for their efforts – the Arevaci began secretly hatching plots against Roman rule by stirring up their equally disgruntled Celtiberian neighbours into the 99-81 BC uprisings (a.k.a. 3rd Celtiberian ‘War’). However, not only were the Arevacians ruthlessly quashed by Proconsul Titus Didius in 93-92 BC, but also had to endure the destruction of their new capital, Termantia, and the city of Colenda in around 98-94 BC.

Romanization
In spite of being technically made subject and finally aggregated to Hispania Citerior after 93 BC, the Arevacians’ relationship with Rome remained uneasy. During the Sertorian Wars, the Arevaci sided with Quintus Sertorius and provided unspecified troops to his army. In fact, they still continued to resist Roman integration and assimilation policies for decades, a situation coupled by fiscal abuse that led to sporadic outbursts of violence well into the 1st century AD.

Although the Arevaci later, in 29 BC, contributed an auxiliary cavalry unit (the Ala Hispanorum Aravacorum) to fight alongside the Roman legions in the first Astur-Cantabrian war, Tacitus cites heavy taxation as the major reason for a revolt in the Termes region which resulted in the ambush and assassination of Lucius Calpurnius Piso, Praetor of H. Citerior in 25 AD.

See also
Astur-Cantabrian war
Celtiberian confederacy
Celtiberian script
Celtiberian Wars
Numantine War
Pre-Roman peoples of the Iberian Peninsula

Notes

References

Ángel Montenegro et alii, Historia de España 2 - colonizaciones y formación de los pueblos prerromanos (1200-218 a.C), Editorial Gredos, Madrid (1989) 
Alfredo Jimeno et alli, La necrópolis celtibérica de Numancia, Coleccion Memorias 12, Consejería de Cultura y Turismo, Valladolid (2004)   
Lorrio Alvarado, Alberto José, Los Celtíberos, Universidad Complutense de Madrid, Murcia (1997) 
Mozota, Francisco Burillo, Los Celtíberos, etnias y estados, Crítica, Barcelona (1998, revised edition 2007) 
Rafael Trevino and Angus McBride, Rome's Enemies (4): Spanish Armies 218BC-19BC, Men-at-Arms series 180, Osprey Publishing Ltd, London (1986) 
Philip Matyszak, Sertorius and the struggle for Spain, Pen & Sword Military, Barnsley (2013)

Further reading

Aedeen Cremin, The Celts in Europe, Sydney, Australia: Sydney Series in Celtic Studies 2, Centre for Celtic Studies, University of Sydney (1992) 
Daniel Varga, The Roman Wars in Spain: The Military Confrontation with Guerrilla Warfare, Pen & Sword Military, Barnsley (2015) 
Dáithí Ó hÓgáin, The Celts: A History, The Collins Press, Cork (2002) 

Esteban, J. Alberto Arenas & Tamayo, Mª Victoria Palacios, El origen del mundo celtibérico, Excmº Ayuntamiento de Molina de Aragón (1999)  
Ludwig Heinrich Dyck, The Roman Barbarian Wars: The Era of Roman Conquest, Author Solutions (2011) ISBNs 1426981821, 9781426981821
Luis Berrocal-Rangel, Los pueblos célticos del soroeste de la Península Ibérica, Editorial Complutense, Madrid (1992) 
John T. Koch (ed.), Celtic Culture: A Historical Encyclopedia, ABC-CLIO Inc., Santa Barbara, California (2006) , 1-85109-445-8

External links
http://www.celtiberiasoria.es
http://www.celtiberia.net
http://www.celtiberiahistorica.es
"The Celtiberian and Roman city of Tiernes": an ongoing excavation

Ancient peoples of Spain
Celtic tribes of the Iberian Peninsula
Pre-Roman peoples of the Iberian Peninsula